Gavin Chester (born 31 December 1959) is an Australian equestrian. He competed in two events at the 2000 Summer Olympics.

References

External links
 

1959 births
Living people
Australian male equestrians
Olympic equestrians of Australia
Equestrians at the 2000 Summer Olympics
People from Sale, Victoria